Sriarpha Ruennak is a Thai voice actress and actress. She was known for her role as Waew in Nang Sao Thong Sroi (นางสาวทองสร้อย) in 1979 and Dao in Poot Pitsawat (ภูตพิศวาส) in 1980. Sriarpha is located in Bang Kruai, Nonthaburi, and does most of her voice-over work at Channel 9, TIGA, and Rose Media and Entertainment.

Sriarpha's biggest role was Thai dubbed version of Shizuka Minamoto in Doraemon. Some of her major roles in anime include Alphonse Elric in Fullmetal Alchemist, Sailor Mercury in Sailor Moon, Haruhi Suzumiya in Haruhi Suzumiya and Ayumi Yoshida, Kazuha Toyama, Yukiko Kudo and Jodie Starling in the TIGA dub of Detective Conan in 1999–2012, some of her fans have nicknamed her "Mae Pueng" or "Mae Pueng Shizuka". (The term 'Mae' in Thai means a 'mother' while 'Pueng' is her real nickname.)

Biography 
Sriarpha graduated from Suan Dusit University, she was an actress for about seven years, and also worked as a television reporter for Channel 9. In 1985, she debuted in voice acting by providing the voice of Creamy Mami in Creamy Mami, the Magic Angel. In 2017, she won the Best Actress at the 31st TV Gold Awards. Sriarpha has also voiced several cute heroines, including Shizuka Minamoto in Doraemon series, Sailor Mercury in Sailor Moon and Sakura Kinomoto in Cardcaptor Sakura.

Filmography

Television series

Voice over roles

Anime
 Creamy Mami, the Magic Angel (Channel 9 dub) - Yuu Morisawa / Creamy Mami
 Doraemon - Shizuka Minamoto
 Dr. Slump (Channel 9 dub) - Gatchan
 Fist of the North Star (Channel 9 dub) - Rin
 Cardcaptor Sakura (Channel 9 dub) - Kinomoto Sakura
 Sailor Moon (Channel 9 dub) - Sailor Mercury
 YuYu Hakusho (Channel 9 dub) - Keiko Yukimura
 Magic Knight Rayearth (Channel 9 dub) - Hikaru Shidou
 Magical DoReMi - Onpu Segawa, Pop Harukaze
 Detective Conan - Ayumi Yoshida, Kazuha Toyama, Yukiko Kudo, Jodie Starling
 You're Under Arrest! (Channel 9 dub) - Miyuki Kobayakawa
 Idaten Jump (Channel 9 dub) - Kakeru Sakamaki
 Ranma ½ (Channel 9 dub) - Shampoo, Kasumi Tendo
 Fruits Basket - Momiji Sohma, Kisa Sohma
 MegaMan NT Warrior (Rockman EXE) - Netto Hikari
 Shattered Angels - Kuu Shiratori
 Please Teacher! - Mizuho Kazami
 Samurai 7 - Kirara
 Genesis of Aquarion - Silvia de Alisia
 MÄR - Ginta Toramizu
 D.Gray-man - Allen Walker
 Evangelion: 2.0 You Can (Not) Advance - Mari Illustrious Makinami
 Nadia: The Secret of Blue Water - Marie
 Mobile Suit Gundam Wing - Relena Peacecraft
 Hikaru no Go - Tōya Akira, Akari Fujisaki
 InuYasha - Kikyo, Sango
 Fullmetal Alchemist - Alphonse Elric
 Air Gear - Ringo
 Sakura Wars - Sumire Kanzaki, Iris Chateaubriand
 Kannazuki no Miko - Chikane Himemiya
 My-HiME - Mikoto Minagi, Yukariko Sanada, Mashiro Kazahana
 Fate/Stay Night - Sakura Mato, Illyasviel von Einzbern, Rider
 Magical Girl Lyrical Nanoha - Nanoha Takamachi
 Perman - Sumire Hoshino (Pāko)
 Mermaid Melody Pichi Pichi Pitch - Hanon Hōshō
 Naruto - Sakura Haruno, Hinata Hyuga
 Sgt. Frog - Natsumi Hinata, Tamama
 Bleach - Orihime Inoue, Karin Kurosaki
 Reborn! - Haru Miura
 Haruhi Suzumiya - Haruhi Suzumiya
 Lucky Star - Konata Izumi
 Great Teacher Onizuka - Tomoko Nomura, Anko Uehara, Nanako Mizuki,
 Yu-Gi-Oh GX - Asuka Tenjouin (season 1)
 Kirarin Revolution - Kirari Tsukishima
 Onegai My Melody - Kuromi, Mana Fujisaki
 Kekkaishi - Tokine Yukimura
 Burst Angel - Sei
 Love Hina -  Mitsune "Kitsune" Konno, Shinobu Maehara
 Tsubasa: Reservoir Chronicle - Sakura
 Street Fighter II V - Chun Li

Film dubbing 
Maleficent: Mistress of Evil - Queen Ingrith (Michelle Pfeiffer)

TV Program dubbing 
 Beyond Tomorrow (Channel 9 dub)
 Lab Rats Challenge (Channel 9 dub) - Nicole Dixon

References

Sriarpha Ruennak
Sriarpha Ruennak
Sriarpha Ruennak
1956 births
Living people